Subsea Internet of Things (SIoT) is a network of smart, wireless sensors and smart devices configured to provide actionable operational intelligence such as performance, condition and diagnostic information.  It is coined from the term The Internet of Things (IoT). Unlike IoT, SIoT focuses on subsea communication through the water and the water-air boundary. SIoT systems are based around smart, wireless devices incorporating Seatooth radio and Seatooth Hybrid technologies. SIoT systems incorporate standard sensors including temperature, pressure, flow, vibration, corrosion and video. Processed information is shared among nearby wireless sensor nodes. SIoT systems are used for environmental monitoring, oil & gas production control and optimisation and subsea asset integrity management.  Some features of IoT's share similar characteristics to cloud computing. There is also a recent increase of interest looking at the integration of IoT and cloud computing.  Subsea cloud computing is an architecture design to provide an efficient means of SIoT systems to manage large data sets. It is an adaption of cloud computing frameworks to meet the needs of the underwater environment. Similarly to fog computing or edge computing, critical focus remains at the edge. Algorithms are used to interrogate the data set for information which is used to optimise production.

References 

Internet of things